Jonathan Edvardsson, (born 7 April 1997) is a Swedish handball player. He was part of the Swedish national team competing in the 2021 World Men's Handball Championship in Egypt.

With IK Sävehof he has become Swedish champion twice, 2019 and 2021. In the season of 2020/21 he was voted into the All-Star Team in the swedish league Handbollsligan, and was also chosen as the MVP of the league. He was also given the award "Årets komet", which is handed to a swedish player who has had their definite breakthrough during the year, and proved to be an important player both in their team and their league.

References

Swedish male handball players
1997 births
Living people
21st-century Swedish people